Iron Township is an inactive township in St. Francois County, in the U.S. state of Missouri.

Iron Township was erected in 1850, taking its name from Iron Mountain.

References

Townships in Missouri
Townships in St. Francois County, Missouri